Franquia is a populated rural area in Artigas Department of northern Uruguay.

Geography
It is located directly north of Bella Unión and northwest of Cuareim.

Population
In 2011 Franquia had a population of 935.
 
Source: Instituto Nacional de Estadística de Uruguay

References

External links
INE map of Franquia and Cuareim

Populated places in the Artigas Department